The 2011–12 Detroit Pistons season was the 71st season of the franchise, the 64th in the National Basketball Association (NBA), and the 55th in the Detroit area. In their first season under head coach Lawrence Frank the team finished with a 25–41 record and in 10th place in the Eastern Conference. In February, center Ben Wallace announced his retirement after 16 seasons, 9 of them spent with the Pistons.

Draft picks

Roster

Pre-season

|- bgcolor=#fcc
| 1
| December 16
| Cleveland
|  
| Austin Daye (18)
| Greg Monroe (13)
| Brandon Knight (4)
| The Palace of Auburn Hills7,927
| 0–1
|- bgcolor=#cfc
| 2
| December 20
| @ Cleveland
|  
| Austin Daye (19)
| Greg MonroeJonas Jerebko (7)
| Brandon Knight (6)
| Quicken Loans Arena9,853
| 1–1

Regular season

Standings

Record vs. opponents

Game log

|- bgcolor=#ffcccc
| 1
| December 26
| @ Indiana
| 
| Rodney Stuckey (17)
| Three players (7)
| Rodney Stuckey (6)
| Bankers Life Fieldhouse18,165
| 0–1
|- bgcolor=#ffcccc
| 2
| December 28
| Cleveland
| 
| Ben Gordon (25)
| Greg Monroe (7)
| Brandon Knight (6)
| The Palace of Auburn Hills22,076
| 0–2
|- bgcolor=#ffcccc
| 3
| December 30
| @ Boston
| 
| Greg Monroe (22)
| Greg Monroe (9)
| Rodney Stuckey (7)
| TD Garden18,624
| 0–3
|- bgcolor=#ccffcc
| 4
| December 31
| Indiana
| 
| Jonas Jerebko (20)
| Jonas Jerebko (12)
| Brandon Knight (6)
| The Palace of Auburn Hills8,824
| 1–3

|- bgcolor=#ccffcc
| 5
| January 2
| Orlando
| 
| Ben Gordon (26)
| Jonas Jerebko (11)
| Ben Gordon (6)
| The Palace of Auburn Hills8,120
| 2–3
|- bgcolor=#ffcccc
| 6
| January 4
| Chicago
| 
| Greg Monroe (19)
| Greg Monroe (13)
| Greg Monroe (5)
| The Palace of Auburn Hills9,125
| 2–4
|- bgcolor=#ffcccc
| 7
| January 6
| @ Philadelphia
|  
| Greg Monroe (22)
| Jonas JerebkoBrandon Knight (9)
| Brandon Knight (4)
| Wells Fargo Center19,408
| 2–5
|- bgcolor=#ffcccc
| 8
| January 7
| New York
| 
| Brandon Knight (19)
| Three players (6)
| Brandon Knight (6)
| The Palace of Auburn Hills12,044
| 2–6
|- bgcolor=#ffcccc
| 9
| January 9
| @ Chicago
| 
| Greg Monroe (14)
| Greg Monroe (10)
| Greg Monroe (6)
| United Center21,530
| 2–7
|- bgcolor=#ffcccc
| 10
| January 10
| Dallas
| 
| Will Bynum (20)
| Greg Monroe (7)
| Austin Daye (4)
| The Palace of Auburn Hills10,073
| 2–8
|- bgcolor=#ffcccc
| 11
| January 12
| @ Milwaukee
| 
| Greg Monroe (32)
| Greg Monroe (16)
| Three players (4)
| Bradley Center11,465
| 2–9
|- bgcolor=#ccffcc
| 12
| January 13
| @ Charlotte
| 
| Jonas Jerebko (22)
| Brandon Knight (10)
| Two players (5)
| Time Warner Cable Arena18,043
| 3–9
|- bgcolor=#ffcccc
| 13
| January 15
| Golden State
| 
| Greg Monroe (25)
| Greg Monroe (8)
| Two players (6)
| The Palace of Auburn Hills11,774
| 3–10
|- bgcolor=#ffcccc
| 14
| January 17
| @ Houston
| 
| Tayshaun Prince (20)
| Greg Monroe (11)
| Greg Monroe (6)
| Toyota Center9,318
| 3–11
|- bgcolor=#ffcccc
| 15
| January 18
| @ Minnesota
| 
| Tayshaun Prince (29) 
| Greg Monroe (12)
| Brandon Knight (6)
| Target Center15,598
| 3–12
|- bgcolor=#ffcccc
| 16
| January 20
| Memphis
| 
| Brandon Knight (22)
| Greg Monroe (13)
| Greg Monroe (4)
| The Palace of Auburn Hills10,255
| 3–13
|- bgcolor=#ccffcc
| 17
| January 21
| Portland
| 
| Rodney Stuckey (28)
| Greg Monroe (8)
| Rodney Stuckey (5)
| The Palace of Auburn Hills14,456
| 4–13
|- bgcolor=#ffcccc
| 18
| January 23
| @ Oklahoma City
| 
| Brandon Knight (13)
| Two players (7)
| Two players (3)
| Chesapeake Energy Arena18,023
| 4–14
|- bgcolor=#ffcccc
| 19
| January 25
| Miami
| 
| Austin Daye (28)
| Greg Monroe (10)
| Rodney Stuckey (6)
| The Palace of Auburn Hills18,058
| 4–15
|- bgcolor=#ffcccc
| 20
| January 27
| Atlanta
| 
| Greg Monroe (22)
| Greg Monroe (11)
| Brandon Knight (8)
| The Palace of Auburn Hills14,010
| 4–16
|- bgcolor=#ffcccc
| 21
| January 28
| @ Philadelphia
| 
| Greg Monroe (16)
| Greg Monroe (10)
| Walker Russel (5)
| Wells Fargo Center18,710
| 4–17
|- bgcolor=#ffcccc
| 22
| January 30
| @ Milwaukee
| 
| Rodney Stuckey (19)
| Greg Monroe (10) 
| Two players (6)
| Bradley Center13,103
| 4–18
|- bgcolor=#ffcccc
| 23
| January 31
| @ New York
| 
| Jonas Jerebko (15) 
| Greg Monroe (12) 
| Two players (3)
| Madison Square Garden19,763
| 4–19

|- bgcolor=#ffcccc
| 24
| February 1
| @ New Jersey
| 
| Two players (21)
| Greg Monroe (8) 
| Three players (4)
| Prudential Center10,504
| 4–20
|- bgcolor=#ccffcc
| 25
| February 3
| Milwaukee
|  
| Brandon Knight (26)
| Jason Maxiell (12)
| Brandon Knight (7)
| The Palace of Auburn Hills13,181
| 5–20
|- bgcolor=#ccffcc
| 26
| February 4
| New Orleans
|  
| Greg Monroe (24)  
| Greg Monroe (16) 
| Tayshaun Prince (5) 
| The Palace of Auburn Hills13,174
| 6–20
|- bgcolor=#ccffcc
| 27
| February 8
| @ New Jersey
| 
| Greg Monroe (20)  
| Greg Monroe (12) 
| Rodney Stuckey (6)
| Prudential Center10,145
| 7–20
|- bgcolor=#ccffcc
| 28
| February 10
| New Jersey
| 
| Jonas Jerebko (20)  
| Greg Monroe (11) 
| Three players (5)
| The Palace of Auburn Hills14,320
| 8–20
|- bgcolor=#ffcccc
| 29
| February 12
| Washington
| 
| Greg Monroe (27) 
| Ben Wallace (7) 
| Walker Russell (4) 
| The Palace of Auburn Hills12,654
| 8–21
|- bgcolor=#ffcccc
| 30
| February 14
| San Antonio
| 
| Rodney Stuckey (23) 
| Jason Maxiell (9)  
| Rodney Stuckey (8)
| The Palace of Auburn Hills11,533
| 8–22
|- bgcolor=#ccffcc
| 31
| February 15
| @ Boston
| 
| Rodney Stuckey (25)
| Ben Wallace (11) 
| Rodney Stuckey (4)
| TD Garden18,624
| 9–22
|- bgcolor=#ccffcc
| 32
| February 17
| Sacramento
| 
| Rodney Stuckey (36)
| Tayshaun Prince (10)
| Brandon Knight (10)
| The Palace of Auburn Hills14,686
| 10–22
|- bgcolor=#ccffcc
| 33
| February 19
| Boston
| 
| Greg Monroe (17)  
| Two players (10) 
| Three players (3)
| The Palace of Auburn Hills22,076
| 11–22
|- bgcolor=#ffcccc
| 34
| February 21
| @ Cleveland
| 
| Brandon Knight (24)
| Greg Monroe (11) 
| Greg Monroe (7) 
| Quicken Loans Arena13,459
| 11–23
|- bgcolor=#ffcccc
| 35
| February 22
| @ Toronto
|  
| Greg Monroe (30) 
| Greg Monroe (14) 
| Walker Russell (4) 
| Air Canada Centre17,125
| 11–24
|- bgcolor=#ffcccc
| 36
| February 28
| Philadelphia
|  
| Greg Monroe (20) 
| Two players (8) 
| Greg Monroe (3)
| The Palace of Auburn Hills11,916
| 11–25
|- bgcolor=#ccffcc
| 37
| February 29
| Charlotte
|  
| Rodney Stuckey (29)
| Greg Monroe (20)
| Brandon Knight (5)
| The Palace of Auburn Hills14,534
| 12–25

|- bgcolor=#ffcccc
| 38
| March 3
| @ Memphis
|  
| Rodney Stuckey (20)
| Greg Monroe (11)
| Two players (4) 
| FedEx Forum17,659
| 12–26
|- bgcolor=#ccffcc
| 39
| March 6
| L. A. Lakers
|  
| Rodney Stuckey (34)
| Greg Monroe (15)
| Ben Gordon(5)
| The Palace of Auburn Hills22,076
| 13–26
|- bgcolor=#ccffcc
| 40
| March 9
| Atlanta
|  
| Greg Monroe (20)
| Jason Maxiell (12)
| Rodney Stuckey (7)
| The Palace of Auburn Hills15,503
| 14–26
|- bgcolor=#ccffcc
| 41
| March 10
| Toronto
|  
| Rodney Stuckey (20)
| Ben Wallace (8)
| Rodney Stuckey (8)
| The Palace of Auburn Hills16,090
| 15–26
|- bgcolor=#ffcccc
| 42
| March 12
| @ Utah
|  
| Rodney Stuckey (29)
| Two players (5)
| Rodney Stuckey (7)
| EnergySolutions Arena19,393
| 15–27
|- bgcolor=#ccffcc
| 43
| March 14
| @ Sacramento
|  
| Rodney Stuckey (35)
| Greg Monroe (11)
| Brandon Knight (11)
| Power Balance Pavilion12,173
| 16–27
|- bgcolor=#ffcccc
| 44
| March 16
| @ Phoenix
|  
| Rodney Stuckey (23)
| Greg Monroe (9)
| Rodney Stuckey (8) 
| US Airways Center17,148
| 16–28
|- bgcolor=#ffcccc
| 45
| March 18
| @ L. A. Clippers
|  
| Greg Monroe (23)
| Greg Monroe (15)
| Two players (5)
| Staples Center19,060
| 16–29
|- bgcolor=#ffcccc
| 46
| March 21
| @ Denver
|  
| Ben Gordon (45)
| Greg Monroe (11)
| Ben Gordon (8)
| Pepsi Center16,681
| 16–30
|- bgcolor=#ffcccc
| 47
| March 23
| Miami
|  
| Brandon Knight (18)
| Jason Maxiell (7)
| Will Bynum (6)
| The Palace of Auburn Hills22,076
| 16–31 
|- bgcolor=#ffcccc
| 48
| March 24
| @ New York
|  
| Ben Gordon (20)
| Ben Wallace (7)
| Walker Russell (4) 
| Madison Square Garden19,763
| 16–32
|- bgcolor=#ccffcc
| 49
| March 26
| @ Washington
|  
| Rodney Stuckey (24)
| Jonas Jerebko (12)
| Brandon Knight (7)
| Verizon Center15,911
| 17–32
|- bgcolor=#ccffcc
| 50
| March 28
| @ Cleveland
|  
| Tayshaun Prince (29)
| Greg Monroe (10)
| Brandon Knight (5)
| Quicken Loans Arena14,486
| 18–32
|- bgcolor=#ffcccc
| 51
| March 30
| @ Chicago
|  
| Brandon Knight (16)
| Greg Monroe (10)
| Tayshaun Prince (6)
| United Center22,385
| 18–33
|- bgcolor=#ccffcc
| 52
| March 31
| Charlotte
|  
| Tayshaun Prince (24)
| Two players (9)
| Brandon Knight (6)
| The Palace of Auburn Hills17,082
| 19–33

|- bgcolor=#ccffcc
| 53
| April 3
| Orlando
|  
| Greg Monroe (22)
| Greg Monroe (11)
| Ben Gordon (7)
| The Palace of Auburn Hills16,741
| 20–33
|- bgcolor=#ccffcc
| 54
| April 5
| Washington
|  
| Greg Monroe (18)
| Jason Maxiell (11)
| Three players (3)
| The Palace of Auburn Hills12,681
| 21–33
|- bgcolor=#ffcccc
| 55
| April 6
| @ Atlanta
|  
| Rodney Stuckey (27)
| Greg Monroe (8)
| Greg Monroe (4)
| Philips Arena15,143
| 21–34
|- bgcolor=#ffcccc
| 56
| April 8
| @ Miami
|  
| Brandon Knight (16) 
| Two players (7)
| Ben Gordon (2)
| American Airlines Arena20,017
| 21–35
|- bgcolor=#ffcccc
| 57
| April 9
| @ Orlando
|  
| Tayshaun Prince (21)
| Tayshaun Prince (8)
| Will Bynum (5)
| Amway Center18,998
| 21–36
|- bgcolor=#ccffcc
| 58
| April 12
| @ Charlotte
|  
| Greg Monroe (25)
| Greg Monroe (11)
| Two players (7)
| Time Warner Cable Arena10,828
| 22–36
|- bgcolor=#ffcccc
| 59
| April 13
| Milwaukee
|  
| Brandon Knight (25) 
| Greg Monroe (10)
| Brandon Knight (8) 
| The Palace of Auburn Hills15,255
| 22–37
|- bgcolor=#ffcccc
| 60
| April 15
| Chicago
|  
| Rodney Stuckey (32)
| Jason Maxiell (9)
| Brandon Knight (7) 
| The Palace of Auburn Hills17,450
| 22–38
|- bgcolor=#ccffcc
| 61
| April 17
| Cleveland
|  
| Brandon Knight (28) 
| Greg Monroe (13)
| Brandon Knight (7) 
| The Palace of Auburn Hills11,595
| 23–38
|- bgcolor=#ffcccc
| 62
| April 18
| @ Atlanta
|  
| Greg Monroe (17)
| Vernon Macklin (9)
| Two players (3)
| Philips Arena14,392
| 23–39
|- bgcolor=#ffcccc
| 63
| April 19
| Minnesota
|  
| Tayshaun Prince (18)
| Charlie Villanueva (12)
| Three players (3)
| The Palace of Auburn Hills12,458
| 23–40
|- bgcolor=#ccffcc
| 64
| April 22
| Toronto
|  
| Two players (19)
| Greg Monroe (17)
| Rodney Stuckey (6)
| The Palace of Auburn Hills14,370
| 24–40
|- bgcolor=#ffcccc
| 65
| April 23
| @Indiana
|  
| Greg Monroe (18)
| Greg Monroe (12)
| Will Bynum (5)
| Bankers Life Fieldhouse13,584
| 24–41
|- bgcolor=#ccffcc
| 66
| April 26
| Philadelphia
|  
| Ben Gordon (26)
| Ben Wallace (12) 
| Brandon Knight (7) 
| The Palace of Auburn Hills15,372
| 25–41

Player statistics

Season

|- align="center" bgcolor=""
| 
|style="background:#eb003c;color:white;" |66 ||style="background:#eb003c;color:white;" |66 || 31.5 || .521 || .000 || .739 ||style="background:#eb003c;color:white;" |9.7 || 2.3 ||style="background:#eb003c;color:white;" |1.3 || .7 ||style="background:#eb003c;color:white;" |15.4
|- align="center" bgcolor="f0f0f0"
| 
| 55 || 48 || 29.9 || .429 || .317 || .834 || 2.6 ||style="background:#eb003c;color:white;" |3.8 || .8 || .2 || 14.8
|- align="center" bgcolor=""
| 
|style="background:#eb003c;color:white;" |66 || 60 || 32.3 || .415 || .380 || .759 || 3.2 ||style="background:#eb003c;color:white;" |3.8 || .7 || .2 || 12.8
|- align="center" bgcolor="f0f0f0"
| 
| 63 || 63 ||style="background:#eb003c;color:white;" |33.1 || .421 || .356 || .774 || 4.5 || 2.4 || .4 || .5 || 12.7
|- align="center" bgcolor=""
| 
| 52 || 21 || 26.9 || .442 ||style="background:#eb003c;color:white;" |.429 ||style="background:#eb003c;color:white;" |.860 || 2.3 || 2.4 || .7 || .2 || 12.5
|- align="center" bgcolor="f0f0f0"
| 
| 64 || 13 || 22.9 || .468 || .302 || .806 || 4.8 || .7 || .6 || .3 || 8.7
|- align="center" bgcolor=""
| 
| 13 || 0 || 13.8 || .385 || .333 || .857 || 3.7 || .5 || .5 || .4 || 7.0
|- align="center" bgcolor="f0f0f0"
| 
| 65 || 42 || 22.6 || .478 || .000 || .547 || 5.1 || .6 || .5 ||style="background:#eb003c;color:white;" |.8 || 6.5
|- align="center" bgcolor=""
| 
| 36 || 0 || 14.3 || .381 || .241 || .766 || 1.6 || 1.8 || .6 || .1 || 5.7
|- align="center" bgcolor="f0f0f0"
| 
| 41 || 4 || 14.7 || .322 || .210 || .814 || 2.2 || .8 || .5 || .5 || 4.7
|- align="center" bgcolor=""
| 
| 60 || 2 || 15.4 || .394 || .304 || .630 || 1.7 || .7 || .5 || .2 || 3.2
|- align="center" bgcolor="f0f0f0"
| 
| 28 || 0 || 12.8 || .347 || .308 || .636 || .9 || 2.1 || .6 || .0 || 3.0
|- align="center" bgcolor=""
| 
| 23 || 0 || 5.9 ||style="background:#eb003c;color:white;" |.543 ||  || .571 || 1.5 || .2 || .2 || .2 || 2.0
|- align="center" bgcolor="f0f0f0"
| 
| 62 || 11 || 15.8 || .395 || .250 || .340 || 4.3 || .7 || .8 ||style="background:#eb003c;color:white;" |.8 || 1.4
|}

Disciplinary actions

Charlie Villanueva missed the first four games of the regular season following a suspension after a scuffle during a game against the Cleveland Cavaliers with Cavs center Ryan Hollins.

Awards
 Brandon Knight was selected for the NBA All-Rookie First Team.

Transactions

Overview

Free agents

Many players signed with teams from other leagues due to the 2011 NBA lockout. FIBA allows players under NBA contracts to sign and play for teams from other leagues if the contracts have opt-out clauses that allow the players to return to the NBA if the lockout ends. The Chinese Basketball Association, however, only allows its clubs to sign foreign free agents who could play for at least the entire season.

See also
2011–12 NBA season

References

Detroit Pistons seasons
Detroit Pistons
Detroit
Detroit